In Greek mythology, Amyntor may refer to the following figures:
 Amyntor, the son of Ormenus, king of Eleon or Ormenium, and the father of Phoenix, Crantor, and Astydamia, who bore Heracles a son named Ctesippus.
 Amyntor was one of the sons of Aegyptus. He was killed by his wife, Damone, one of the Danaïdes.
Amyntor, son of Phrastor, was the father of Teutamides and grandfather of Nanas. In the latter's reign, the Pelasgians were driven out of Greece and colonized a land which was later called Tyrrhenia.

Notes

References 
 Apollodorus, The Library with an English Translation by Sir James George Frazer, F.B.A., F.R.S. in 2 Volumes, Cambridge, MA, Harvard University Press; London, William Heinemann Ltd. 1921. ISBN 0-674-99135-4. Online version at the Perseus Digital Library. Greek text available from the same website.
 Dionysius of Halicarnassus. Roman Antiquities, Volume I: Books 1-2. Translated by Earnest Cary. Loeb Classical Library No. 319. Cambridge, Massachusetts: Harvard University Press, 1937. Online version by Bill Thayer. Online version at Harvard University Press.
Dionysus of Halicarnassus, Roman Antiquities. English translation by Earnest Cary in the Loeb Classical Library, 7 volumes. Harvard University Press, 1937-1950. Online version at Bill Thayer's Web Site.
Dionysius of Halicarnassus, Antiquitatum Romanarum quae supersunt, Vol I-IV. . Karl Jacoby. In Aedibus B.G. Teubneri. Leipzig. 1885. Greek text available at the Perseus Digital Library.
 Fowler, Robert L., Early Greek Mythography. Volume 2: Commentary. Oxford University Press. Great Clarendon Street, Oxford, OX2 6DP, United Kingdom. 2013. 
Fowler, R. L. (2000), Early Greek Mythography: Volume 1: Text and Introduction, Oxford University Press, 2000. .
 Gaius Julius Hyginus, Fabulae from The Myths of Hyginus translated and edited by Mary Grant. University of Kansas Publications in Humanistic Studies. Online version at the Topos Text Project.
 Homer, The Iliad with an English Translation by A.T. Murray, Ph.D. in two volumes. Cambridge, MA., Harvard University Press; London, William Heinemann, Ltd. 1924. . Online version at the Perseus Digital Library.
Homer, Homeri Opera in five volumes. Oxford, Oxford University Press. 1920. . Greek text available at the Perseus Digital Library.

Ancient Greeks
Kings in Greek mythology